Calicha is a genus of moths in the family Geometridae.

Species
 Calicha nooraria (Bremer, 1864)
 Calicha ornataria (Leech, 1897)

References
 Calicha at Markku Savela's Lepidoptera and Some Other Life Forms
 Natural History Museum Lepidoptera genus database

Boarmiini